John Reidar Floeng (15 May 1918 – 24 December 2014) was a Norwegian politician for the Conservative Party.

He was born in Åsnes, but moved to Mysen. He started his career in the Norwegian State Railways, but inherited his father-in-law's company Ous & Co in 1948. After thirty years as chief executive he finished his career as office manager in Lundeby & Co.

Floeng was elected as mayor of Mysen, serving from 1952 to 1955. He served as a deputy representative to the Parliament of Norway from Østfold during the term 1961–1965.

References

1918 births
2014 deaths
People from Åsnes
People from Eidsberg
Deputy members of the Storting
Conservative Party (Norway) politicians
Mayors of places in Østfold
Norwegian businesspeople